TemA is a politically unaffiliated daily newspaper published in Tirana, Albania in the Albanian language. Founded in July 1999, TemA is one of the oldest daily newspapers in Albania and currently sells about 15,000 daily copies  nationwide.

Tema Online is the online version of Tema daily newspaper is currently one of the most popular websites in Albania, offering news, comments and entertainment. The website has on average 800,000 to 1,000,000 visits per day according to TemA. 

TemA Online also provides an English edition for its international readers and expats. Gazeta TemA has become well known for breaking several high profile cases such as the personal involvement of the son of former PM Berisha in arm deals for Afghan soldiers, the privatisation of the Albanian state oil refinery ARMO by controversial Albanian businessman Rezart Taci, the publishing of leaked nude pictures of current PM Edi Rama etc.

The relentless scrutiny and criticism of governmental policies has also taken its toll on TemA newspaper. That is when the newspaper turned its total attention to pioneering online media and only returned its print version in 2011, thus becoming one of the most popular online news outlets in Albania.

Content

Sections
The newspaper is organised in three sections, including the magazine.
 News: Includes International, National, Tirana, Politics, Business, Technology, Science, Health, Sports, Education.
 Opinion: Includes Editorials, Op-Eds and Letters to the Editor.
 Features: Includes Arts, Movies, Theatre, and Sport.

Web presence
Tema has had a web presence since 1999. Accessing articles requires no registration. The website has on average 800,000 to 1,000,000 visits per day according to TemA. The newspaper is also available in PDF.

References

External links
Tema 

1999 establishments in Albania
Publications established in 1999
Newspapers published in Albania
Albanian-language newspapers
Mass media in Tirana